Christopher J. Fettweis is an American political scientist and Professor of Political Science at Tulane University. He is known for his expertise on American foreign relations.

Books
 Making Foreign Policy Decisions: A Presidential Briefing Book, Transactions Press, 2015 
 The Pathologies of Power: Fear, Honor, Glory and Hubris in U.S. Foreign Policy, Cambridge University Press, 2013 
 Dangerous Times? The International Politics of Great Power Peace, Georgetown University Press, 2010 
 Losing Hurts Twice as Bad: The Four Stages to Moving Beyond Iraq, W.W. Norton, 2008

References

External links
Christopher Fettweis at Tulane University
Christopher Fettweis CV
How Superpowers See the World - Discussion with Christopher Fettweis

Tulane University faculty
International relations scholars
University of Maryland, College Park alumni
Naval War College faculty
University of Notre Dame alumni
Living people
American political scientists
Year of birth missing (living people)